Ruoi may refer to:
Ruoi, a minor Enochian angel
Rươi, the Vietnamese name for Nereididae sandworms, which are used in cooking
 Ruồi. the Vietnamese term for fly

See also
Chả rươi, a variety of Vietnamese omelette made with Nereididae sandworms